Falkirk East may mean or refer to:

 Falkirk East (UK Parliament constituency)
 Falkirk East (Scottish Parliament constituency)